Estonia participated in The VI. Winter Paralympic Games in Lillehammer, Norway.

Estonia entered 13 athletes in the following sports:
Biathlon and Cross-country skiing: 1 male and 1 female 
Ice sledge hockey: 9 males
Ice sledge speed racing: 1 male and 1 female

Medalists

Bronze
 Vilma Nugis — Cross-country skiing, Women's 5 km Free Technique B3

The 1994 Estonian Paralympic Team

Biathlon
 Ants Palopääl
 Vilma Nugis

Cross-country skiing
 Ants Palopääl
 Vilma Nugis

Ice sledge speed racing
 Aivar Kink
 Alja Kivi

Ice sledge hockey: Team Roster 9 men

Name, no, position, goals 
 Vjatšeslav Vassiljev
 Jüri Tammleht – 12, Center
 Eduard Semjonov
 Raul Sas – Net Minder
 Jaak Pihlakas
 Tarmo Pärnapuu
 Arvo Kelement
 Viktor Karlenko
 Leonid Zubov – 9, Forward

Results by event

Biathlon 

 Vilma Nugis
 Women's 7.5 km Free Technique B1-3 – Real time:38.01,0 (Missed shots: 8) Factor(%): 100; Finish time: 38.01,0(→ 7. place )
 Ants Palopääl
 Men's 7.5 km Free Technique B3 –  Real time:34.22,3 (Missed shots: 8) Factor(%): 100; Finish time: 34.22,3 (→ 10. place )

Cross-country skiing

 Ants Palopääl
 Men's 5 km Classical Technique B3 – Finish time: 16.26,9 (→ 10. place )
 Men's 10 km Free Technique B3 – Finish time: 29.09,9 (→ 9. place )
 Men's 20 km Classical Technique B3 – Finish time: 1:09.03,5 (→ 13. place )
 Vilma Nugis 
 Women's 5 km Free Technique B3 – Finish time: 16.47,0 (→  Bronze Medal )
 Women's 5 km Classical Technique B3 – Finish time: 18.32,0 (→ 4. place )
 Women's 10 km Classical Technique B3 – Finish time: 54.55,4 (→ 4. place )

Ice sledge speed racing

 Aivar Kink
 Men's 100 m LW10-11 – Finish time: 18,22 (→ 13. place )
 Men's 500 m LW10-11 – Finish time: 1.21,26 (→ 13. place )
 Men's 1000 m LW10-11 – Finish time: 3.06,93 (→ 11. place )
 Men's 1500 m LW10-11 –  (→ dnf, no ranking )
 Alja Kivi
 Women's 100 m LW10-11 – Finish time: 21,69 (→ 4. place )
 Women's 500 m LW10-11 – Finish time: 1.37,16 (→ 6. place )
 Women's 700 m LW10-11 – (→ dqa, no ranking )
 Women's 1000 m LW10-11 – Finish time: 3.07,12 (→ 5. place )

Ice sledge hockey

Preliminary round
 Preliminary Round 1: lost to  0:2 ( 0:0, 0:1, 0:1 )
 Preliminary Round 2: lost to  0:5 ( 0:4, 0:1, 0:0 )
 Preliminary Round 3: lost to  1:4 ( 0:1, 0:1, 1:2 )
 Preliminary Round 4: lost to  1:6 ( 0:2, 0:3, 1:1 ) (→ did not to advance, 5. place )

See also
1994 Winter Paralympics
Estonia at the Paralympics
Estonia at the 1994 Winter Olympics

External links
International Paralympic Committee
 Estonian Paralympic Committee
Lillehammer 1994 Paralympic results

Nations at the 1994 Winter Paralympics
1994
Paralympics